Ashley Holzer (née Nicoll; born 10 October 1963) is a Canadian-born equestrian specializing in dressage, who has been representing the United States since 2017. She was born in Toronto, the daughter of Moreen and Ian Nicoll, and is married to Charles Holzer. Representing Canada, she won a bronze medal in team dressage at the 1988 Summer Olympics in Seoul, together with teammates Cynthia Neale-Ishoy, Eva Pracht and Gina Smith. She also competed at the 2004, 2008 and 2012 Summer Olympics.

Personal life
Ashley is married to Charles Holzer, who competed for the United States Virgin Islands at the 1992 Summer Olympics in show-jumping. She has two children; Harrison Holzer and Emma Holzer, who are both film actors. Holzer became a citizen of the United States in February 2016.

Notable Horses 
 Reipo
 1988 Summer Olympics - Team Bronze, Individual 16th Place
 Imperioso - 1990 Chestnut Dutch Warmblood Stallion (Cocktail x Tangelo)
 2002 World Equestrian Games - Individual 38th Place
 2003 Open European Championships - Individual 27th Place
 2004 Summer Olympics - Team 9th Place, Individual 42nd Place
 Gambol - 1994 Bay Dutch Warmblood Stallion (Gabor x Lector)
 2006 World Equestrian Games - Individual 45th Place
 Pop Art - 1997 Chestnut Dutch Warmblood Gelding (Amsterdam x Cabochon)
 2008 Summer Olympics - Team 8th Place, Individual 12th Place
 2009 World Cup - Individual 5th Place
 2010 World Equestrian Games - Team 7th Place, Individual Special 11th Place, Individual Freestyle 8th Place
 Breaking Dawn - 2001 Bay Dutch Warmblood Gelding (Akribori x Ronald)
 2012 Summer Olympics - Team 10th Place, Individual 24th Place

References

External links

1963 births
Living people
Sportspeople from Toronto
Canadian female equestrians
American female equestrians
Canadian dressage riders
American dressage riders
Olympic equestrians of Canada
Olympic medalists in equestrian
Olympic bronze medalists for Canada
Equestrians at the 1988 Summer Olympics
Medalists at the 1988 Summer Olympics
Equestrians at the 2004 Summer Olympics
Equestrians at the 2008 Summer Olympics
Equestrians at the 2012 Summer Olympics
Equestrians at the 2003 Pan American Games
Pan American Games medalists in equestrian
Pan American Games silver medalists for Canada
Canadian emigrants to the United States
Medalists at the 2003 Pan American Games
21st-century American women